This is a list of Zimbabwean politicians. It includes current and former politicians of the African nation of Zimbabwe and major politicians of its predecessor states.

A

Jock Alves ( 1909–1979), Rhodesian Front politician; and former mayor of Salisbury (now Harare)
Mike Auret (1936–2020), human rights activist and former MDC MP

B
 Canaan Banana (1936–2003), ZANU politician; first President of Zimbabwe
Gift Banda (born 1969), deputy mayor of Bulawayo
Roy Bennett (1957–2018), former  MDC–T MP and senator
Michael Bimha (born 1954), MP and cabinet minister
Flora Buka (born 1968), MP and cabinet minister
David Butau (born 1957), MP
P. K. van der Byl (1923-1999), MP and minister

C
Aeneas Chigwedere (1939–2021), former Minister of Education and Governor of Mashonaland East Province
James Chikerema (1925–2006), president of the Front for the Liberation of Zimbabwe, later served as MP
Chenhanho Chimutengwende (born 1943), former Minister of State for Public and Interactive Affairs
 Ruth Chinamano (1925–2005), ZANU–PF MP
Christopher Chingosho (born 1952), ZANU–PF MP and deputy minister
 Joseph Chinotimba (born 1958), political figure associated to the ZANU–PF party
 Jeremiah Chirau (1923–1985), leader of the Zimbabwe United People's Organisation
 Herbert Chitepo (1923–1975), leader of the Zimbabwe African National Union until his assassination
 George Chiweshe (born 1953), former brigadier general and Chairperson of the Zimbabwe Electoral Commission
 Fay Chung (born 1941), former Minister of Education 
 Guy Clutton-Brock (1906–1995), English farmer and social worker who became a founding member of the Southern Rhodesia African National Congress
Charles Coghlan (1863–1927), Prime Minister of Southern Rhodesia, leader of Rhodesia Party
 David Coltart (born 1957), human rights lawyer, former Minister of Education, founding member of the Movement for Democratic Change
 Stuart Comberbach (born 1952), diplomat and politician

D
 Dumiso Dabengwa (1939–2019), President of the Zimbabwe African People's Union
 Margaret Dongo (born 1960), former independent member of Parliament, founder of the Zimbabwe Union of Democrats
 Fletcher Dulini Ncube (1940–2014), founding member of the Movement for Democratic Change (1999-2005)
 Enoch Dumbutshena (1920–2000), Zimbabwe's first black judge, Chief Justice from 1984 to 1990
 Clifford Dupont (1905–1978), first President of Rhodesia

E
 Henry Everard (1897–1980), president of Rhodesia

F
 Winston Field (1904–1969), seventh Prime Minister of Southern Rhodesia, co-founder of the Rhodesian Front political party

G
Tony Gara (1939–2006), former mayor of Harare, MP, and deputy minister
Aguy Georgias (1935–2015), former deputy minister
 Border Gezi (1964–2001), former Minister for Gender, Youth and Employment, and former Resident Minister and Governor for Mashonaland Central
Herbert Gomba (born  1977), current mayor of Harare
Josiah Gondo (?–1972), former MP
 Aleck Gumbo (born 1940), former Minister of Economic Development
 Josiah Zion Gumede (1919–1989), first and only President of Zimbabwe Rhodesia
Tizirai Gwata (born 1943), first black mayor of Harare
 Munyaradzi Gwisai (born 1968), former MDC–T MP

H
William John Harper (1916-2006), cabinet minister and MP
Byron Hove (1940–1999) former justice minister and ZANU-PF MP
 Jack Howman (1919-2000), former minister and MP
 Godfrey Huggins (1883–1971), former Prime Minister of Southern Rhodesia and Prime Minister of the Federation of Rhodesia and Nyasaland and leader of United Rhodesia Party
 Chenjerai "Hitler" Hunzvi (1949–2001), former Chairman of the Zimbabwe National Liberation War Veterans Association

J
 Tichaona Jokonya (1938–2006), former Minister of Information and Publicity of Zimbabwe
 Learnmore Jongwe (1974–2002), former spokesman and MP for the MDC

K
 Iain Kay (born 1949), former MDC-T MP
Jock Kay (1921–?), former ZANU-PF MP and deputy minister
Simon Khaya-Moyo (1945–2021), former ZANU-PF MP, cabinet minister, chairman of ZANU-PF, and ambassador to South Africa
 Nicholas Kitikiti (born ?), ambassador to Iran and former secretary of state
 Patrick Kombayi (1938–2009), MDC-T senator and former mayor of Gweru
 Wilson Kumbula (born 1937), ZANU-PF MP

L
Desmond Lardner-Burke (1909–1984), MP and cabinet minister

M
 Lovemore Madhuku (born 1966), NCA leader
 Moven Mahachi (1948–2001), former Minister of Defence and ZANU-PF MP
 Charles Shanyurai Majange(born ?), Pan-African Parliament MP
 Alfred Makwarimba (born ?), president of the Zimbabwe Federation of Trade Unions
 Washington Malianga (1926–2014), one of the founding members of ZANU and party secretary
Tabetha Kanengoni Malinga (born 1982), former deputy minister, minister of state, and MP
 Witness Mangwende (1946–2005), former cabinet minister and governor of Harare province
 Elliot Manyika (1955–2008), minister without Portfolio and National political Commissar for ZANU-PF
 Muchadeyi Masunda (born 1952), former mayor of Harare
 Cain Mathema (born 1947), ambassador to Zambia, minister without portfolio, and former governor of Bulawayo
 Lovemore Matombo (?–2020), former President of the Zimbabwe Congress of Trade Unions
 Bright Matonga (born ?), cabinet minister and ZANU-PF MP
 Isaac Matongo (1947–2007), activist
 Amos Midzi (1952–2015), former cabinet minister and MP
 Priscilla Misihairabwi-Mushonga (born ?), ambassador to Sweden, minister, and MP
George Mitchell (1867-1937), former Prime Minister of Southern Rhodesia, leader of the Responsible Government Association or Rhodesian Party
 Paul Tangi Mhova Mkondo (1945–2013), ZANU–PF treasurer
 Promise Mkwananzi (born ?),former President of the Zimbabwe National Student Union
Auxillia Mnangagwa (born 1963), current First Lady of Zimbabwe, and former member of parliament
Emmerson Mnangagwa (born 1942), current President of Zimbabwe, former cabinet minister and Speaker of Parliament
Tongai Mnangagwa (born 1978), ZANU-PF MP
 Max Mnkandla (born ?), President of the Zimbabwe Liberators' Peace Initiative
Raj Modi (born 1959), MP and deputy minister of industry and commerce
 Howard Unwin Moffat (1869–1951),former Premier of Southern Rhodesia, leader of Rhodesian Party 
 Swithun Mombeshora (1945–2003), former state minister
 Jonathan Moyo (born 1957), MP and former state minister
 Simbi Mubako (born ?), former ambassador to the United States
 Olivia Muchena (born 1946), former cabinet minister
 Opa Muchinguri (born 1958), government minister
 Elias Mudzuri (born ?), Ministry of Energy and Power Development and former mayor of Harare
 Grace Mugabe (born 1965), former first lady of Zimbabwe
 Robert Mugabe (1924–2019), former President of Zimbabwe and leader of ZANU-PF
Sally Mugabe (1931–1992), former first lady of Zimbabwe
 Joyce Mujuru (born 1955), founder and president of the National People's Party  former first vice-president,
 Solomon Mujuru (1945–2011), former second gentleman of Zimbabwe and commander of the Zimbabwe Defence Forces
 Elphas Mukonoweshuro (1953–2011), former MDC-T MP and Minister of Public Service
 Samuel Mumbengegwi (1942–2016), Minister of Higher Education and ZANU-PF Chairperson
 Chris Mushohwe (born 1954), Resident Minister and Governor of Manicaland Province, senator, and former minister of information and broadcasting services
 Arthur Mutambara (born 1966), former Deputy Prime Minister, leader of MDC-M party (born 1966)
 Charles Mutasa (born ?), Economic, Social and Cultural Council Vice-President
 Munacho Mutezo (born 1954), former Minister of Energy and Power Development, ZANU-PF MP, and founding member and vice-president of the Party Zimbabwe People First (ZimPF)
 Giles Mutsekwa (born 1948), home affairs minister and MP
 Simon Muzenda (1922–2003), former Vice-President of Zimbabwe, minister of foreign affairs, and deputy prime minister
 Abel Muzorewa (1925–2010), first and only Prime Minister of Zimbabwe-Rhodesia

N
Prag Lalloo Naran (1926–1981) leading member of the Zimbabwe Asian Community
 Japhet Ndabeni Ncube (born ?), commissioner at the Zimbabwean Human Rights Commission and chairs the Thematic Working group on Socio-Economic and Cultural Rights
 Welshman Ncube (born 1961), vice-president of Citizens Coalition for Change, founder and former leader of the MDC-N, and Minister of Industry and Commerce
 Francis Nhema (born 1959) ZANU-PF MP and former government minister
Naomi Nhiwatiwa (1941–2012), former deputy minister
 Enos Nkala (1932–2013) one of the founders of ZANU and former minister
 Martin K. Moyo (1952), former Mayor of Bulawayo
 Denis Norman (1931–2019) former government minister
 Maurice Nyagumbo (1924–1989), former minister and party secretary for ZANU
 Mike Nyambuya (born 1955), former governor of Manicaland, minister, and general
 George Nyandoro (1926–1994), one of the founders of SRANC and activist

P
 Mark Partridge (1922–2007), former Rhodesian cabinet minister and member of both the Rhodesian and Zimbabwean parliaments

R
 Engelbert Rugeje (born 1962) former commissar for ZANU-PF, general officer and Chief of Staff
 Tinos Rusere (1945–2007) trade union activist, former ZANU-PF MP, and deputy minister

S
 Thompson Samkange (1893–1956), founder of the Bantu National Congress and former UANC leader
Oliver Saunyama (?–1980), ZANU representative to Botswana
 Nathan Shamuyarira (1928–2014), former minister 
 Daniel Shumba (born ?), former ZANU-PF deputy secretary of transport and welfare and MP
 Felix Magalela Mafa Sibanda (born 1951), MDC-T MP
 Jabulani Sibanda (born ?), former ZNLWVA chairman
 Nkululeko Sibanda (born 1979), former ZINASU president
 Ndabaningi Sithole (1920–2000), former MP, founder of Zimbabwe African National Union (ZANU) and later ZANU-Ndonga
David Smith (1922–1996), former Deputy Prime Minister of Rhodesia, minister of Rhodesia, Zimbabwe Rhodesia, and Zimbabwe
 Ian Smith (1919–2007), former Prime Minister of Rhodesia, leader of Rhodesian Front and Conservative Alliance of Zimbabwe 
 Lance Bales Smith (1910–2000), former MP and minister
 Ronald Snapper (born ?), secretary of the Inter-territorial Organization for Eurafrican Organizations in Rhodesia
 Timothy Stamps (1936–2017), former ZANU–PF MP and minister of health
 Trudy Stevenson (1944–2018), former MP and ambassador to Senegal and the Gambia
 Wally Stuttaford (born ?), former MP
 Rubidge Stumbles (1904-1978), former minister and MP

T 
 Leopold Takawira (1916–1970), former ZANU Vice-President
 Edgar Tekere (1937–2011), former Secretary-General ZANU-PF and leader of Zimbabwe Unity Movement
 Garfield Todd (1908–2002), former Prime Minister of Southern Rhodesia, leader of United Rhodesia Party, United Federal Party and Central Africa Party, opponent of white minority rule, former member of the Senate of Zimbabwe
 Judith Todd (born 1943), Rhodesian activist
 Langton Towungana (born ?), independent politician
 Morgan Tsvangirai (1952–2018), former Prime Minister of the Republic of Zimbabwe, leader of the MDC-T party
 Josiah Tungamirai (1948–2005) former Minister of State for Indigenization and Empowerment, MP, and Air Chief Marshal

U
 Herbert Ushewokunze (born ?) one of the founders of ZANU, 1st minister of health, and minister of home affairs

W
 Denis Walker (born 1933), Rhodesian cabinet minister and MP in both Rhodesia and Zimbabwe
Maureen Thelma Watson (1925–1994), Rhodesian activist and MP
Nicola Watson (born 1955), MDC MP
 Roy Welensky (1907–1991), second Prime Minister of the Federation of Rhodesia and Nyasaland and United Federal Party leader
 Edgar Whitehead (1905–1971), sixth Prime Minister of Southern Rhodesia and United Federal Party leader
 John Wrathall (1913–1978), minister, senator, MP, and president of Rhodesia

Z
 Beauty Zhuwao (born 1965), ZANU–PF politician
 Patrick Zhuwao (born 1967), former ZANU–PF MP and deputy minister
Ziyambi Ziyambi (born ?), ZANU–PF MP and deputy minister
Sesel Zvidzai (born ?), MDC–T MP and deputy minister
Murisi Zwizwai (born ?), MDC MP and deputy minister

See also 
 List of heads of state of Zimbabwe

References

 
 
Zimbabwean